The Chinese Ambassador to Malta is the official representative of the People's Republic of China to the Republic of Malta.

List of representatives

References 

 
Malta
China